Mike Fall is a retired American soccer player who played professionally in the Major Indoor Soccer League, American Indoor Soccer Association and American Soccer League.

Youth
Fall graduated from Bishop Moore High School in Orlando, Florida where he was part of the school's state championship soccer team.  He attended the University of Tampa, playing two years on the men's soccer team (1981–1982).  In 1981, Tampa won the NCAA Division II Men's Soccer Championship.

Professional
In 1983, the Tampa Bay Rowdies selected Fall in the North American Soccer League draft and he appeared in one indoor exhibition match for Tampa Bay.  When the Rowdies did not sign him for the outdoor season, Fall joined the Jacksonville Tea Men of the American Soccer League.  The Tea Men won the 1983 championship, with Fall scoring two goals.  Fall spent the 1983-1984 indoor season with the Americans, then returned to the Tea Men, now playing in the United Soccer League, for the 1984 outdoor season.  In the fall of 1984, Fall joined the Louisville Thunder of the American Indoor Soccer League.  He spent two seasons with the Thunder.  In 1985, Fall was the captain of the U.S. soccer team at the 1985 Summer Universiade.  In 1986, Fall joined the independent Orlando Lions.  In 1986, the Thunder traded Fall to the Rowdies in exchange for the rights to Pete Smith.  In 1988, he played for the Rowdies in the American Soccer League.

External links
 MISL stats

References

Living people
1961 births
Bishop Moore High School alumni
American soccer players
American Soccer League (1933–1983) players
American Indoor Soccer Association players
Jacksonville Tea Men players
Major Indoor Soccer League (1978–1992) players
Memphis Americans players
Tampa Bay Rowdies draft picks
North American Soccer League (1968–1984) indoor players
Tampa Bay Rowdies (1975–1993) players
Orlando Lions players
Soccer players from South Carolina
Sportspeople from Columbia, South Carolina
Tampa Spartans men's soccer players
United Soccer League (1984–85) players
Association football forwards